John McKeown (1859 – September 9, 1919) was an Irish-American politician from New York.

Life 
McKeown was born in 1859 in Ireland. He immigrated to the United States when he was 18 and settled in Brooklyn. Starting in 1880, he worked in the shoe business.

In 1890, McKeown was elected to the Kings County board of supervisors. In 1892, he was re-elected supervisor. In 1894, he was elected to the New York State Assembly as a Democrat, representing the Kings County 1st District. He served in the Assembly in 1895, 1896, 1897, 1898, 1899, 1900, 1901, 1902, 1903, 1904, and 1905. In his last year in the Assembly, he was appointed a member of the Hughes-Armstrong Insurance Investigating Committee.

In 1906, Mayor George B. McClellan Jr. appointed McKeown Deputy Tenement House Commissioner, in charge of Brooklyn, Queens, and Richmond. In 1911, Comptroller Somers appointed him Supervisor of Private Bank Examiners. In 1918, he was appointed Clerk of the First District Municipal Court.

McKeown was married to Esther McGowan. Their children were Marie, Esther, Majorie, Virginia, Helen, John A., James Mitchell, and Frank E. He was a member of the Roman Catholic Orphan Asylum Society, the Knights of Columbus, St. Patrick's Society, the St. James Holy Name Society, and the Kings County Democratic Committee. He was a parishioner of St. James Pro-cathedral.

McKeown died at home on September 9, 1919. He was buried in Holy Cross Cemetery.

References

External links 

 The Political Graveyard

1859 births
1919 deaths
Irish emigrants to the United States (before 1923)
Town supervisors in New York (state)
19th-century American politicians
20th-century American politicians
Democratic Party members of the New York State Assembly
Catholics from New York (state)
Politicians from Brooklyn
Burials at Holy Cross Cemetery, Brooklyn